At the end of each CONCACAF Gold Cup final tournament, several awards are presented to the players and teams which have distinguished themselves in various aspects of the match.

Awards 
There are currently seven post-tournament awards
 the Best Player for most valuable player;
 the Top Goalscorer for most prolific goal scorer;
 the Best Goalkeeper  for most outstanding goalkeeper;
 the Best Young Player  for most young player; 
 the Team of the Tournament for best combined team of players at the tournament;
 the Goal of the Tournament, for best goal, first awarded in 2021;
 the Fair Play Award for the team with the best record of fair play.

Best Player

Top Goalscorer

Best Goalkeeper

Best Young Player

Team of the Tournament

Goal of the Tournament
The Goal of the Tournament award was awarded for the first time at the 2021 CONCACAF Gold Cup.

Fair Play Award

See also 
 FIFA World Cup awards
 UEFA European Championship awards
 Copa América awards
 Africa Cup of Nations awards
 AFC Asian Cup awards
 OFC Nations Cup awards

References

CONCACAF Gold Cup